Bob Nanna (born June 14, 1975) is an American musician best known as the singer and guitarist for the bands Braid and Hey Mercedes.
Nanna also currently performs as part of the band Lifted Bells, as well as a solo project The City on Film.

Biography
Robert Thomas Nanna was born in Chicago, Illinois.

In 2013 he co-founded Downwrite, a songwriting website, with Mark Rose of the band Spitalfield.

Discography

with Orwell
1995 (Expert Work, 2020) - LP 2020

with Friction
Blurred In Six (Allied, 1994) - LP 1993
Hours of Operation (Polyvinyl, 2002) - 2xCD 2002

with Braid

Frankie Welfare Boy Age Five
The Age of Octeen
Frame and Canvas
Movie Music, Vol. 1
Movie Music, Vol. 2
Lucky to Be Alive
Closer to Closed
No Coast

with Hey Mercedes
Everynight Fire Works (Vagrant)
Loses Control (Vagrant)

with The City On Film
In Formal Introduction (Grand Theft Autumn)
La Vella (Topshelf, 2014)

with The Sky Corvair
The Sky Corvair - Unsafe At Any Speed (Actionboy Records, 2005) CD

with Certain People I Know
Certain People I Know - Certain People I Know (Count Your Lucky Stars, 2012)

with Lifted Bells
Lifted Bells - Minor Tantrums (Run For Cover, 2018)

Singles and EPs 

 Friction / Cap'n Jazz - 'Nothing Dies with Blue Skies (Shadefork Records, 1994) - single
 Friction - Makeshift (Shadefork Records, 1993) - 3 song 7"
 Braid - Rainsnowmatch (Enclave /Polyvinyl 1993) - EP
 Braid - I'm Afraid of Everything / Radish White Icicle / Now I'm Exhausted (Grand Theft Autumn, 1994) - single
 Braid - Niagara / That Car Came Out Of Nowhere (Grand Theft Autumn, 1994) - single
 Braid - First Day Back / Hugs From Boys (Polyvinyl, 1995) - single
 The City On Film / Kind Of Like Spitting / Sterling Silver - Slowdance Tour (Slowdance, 1998) - EP
 Braid - Please Drive Faster Polyvinyl (1998) - EP
 The City On Film - Two Hour Anniversary (About Midnight, 1997) - 7"
 The City On Film / Kind Of Like Spitting - Split (Sport, 1998) - 7"
 Braid / Eversor / The Lovemen / 3minutemovie - Japan Tour CD (1999) - 3" CD
 Hey Mercedes - Hey Mercedes Polyvinyl, (2000) - EP
 Bob Nanna / Elizabeth Elmore - Bob Nanna/Elizabeth Elmore EP (Troubleman Unlimited, 1999) - EP
 Hey Mercedes - The Weekend (Vagrant, 2003) - single, EP
 Hey Mercedes / Favez - Split (Sound Fiction, 2003) - 7"
 The City On Film - I'd Rather Be Wine Drunk (Post 436, 2004) - EP
 The City On Film / The Novi Split - The Sea Was Angry That Day My Friends (Eat The Fly, 2004) - EP
 Hey Mercedes - Unorchestrated (Grand Theft Autumn, 2005) - EP, compilation
 The City On Film - Little Informal (Grand Theft Autumn, 2005) - EP
 The City On Film - American Diary (Redder, 2005) - EP
 The City on Film / Minus the Bear - Split (Polyvinyl, 2006) - 7"
 The City on Film / Owen - Split (Red Cars Go Faster, 2007) - 7"
 Bob Nanna & Lauren Lo / Into It Over It - "Split" (Evil Weevil, 2010) - 7"<ref>{{cite web|url=https://www.punknews.org/article/38072/streams-bob-nanna-and-lauren-lo-into-it-over-it-split-7|title=Bob Nanna & Lauren Lo / Into It. Over It. : split 7|publisher=Punknews.org|author=Yancey, Bryne|date=April 27, 2010|access-date=October 18, 2022}}</ref>
 Braid / Balance and Composure - "Split" (No Sleep, 2013) - 7"
 Lifted Bells - s/t EP (Naked Ally, 2013) - 12" EP
 Lifted Bells - "Lights Out" (Naked Ally, 2014) - 7"
 Braid "Kids Get Grids" (Topshelf, 2015) - Record Store Day Exclusive 7"
 Lifted Bells - "Overreactor" (Run For Cover, 2016) - 12" EP

Compilations
Various - Direction (Polyvinyl) - Braid - "I'm Glowing and You're The Reason"
Various - Direction (Polyvinyl) - Orwell - "Angular Momentum" (guest artist)
Various - My Pal God Holiday Record (My Pal God, 1997) - The City On Film - "Fairytale Of New York"
Various - World Domination in Thirteen Easy Steps (Stratagem, 1998) - Braid - "Collect From Clark Kent"
Various - Where Is My Mind? A Tribute To The Pixies (Glue Factory, 1998) - Braid - "Trompe Le Monde"
Various - Another Year On The Streets Vol. 2 (Vagrant, 2001) - Hey Mercedes - " Our Weekend Starts On Wednesday"
Friction - Hours of Operation: Discography, 1991-1993 Polyvinyl (2004) - compilation
Various - THICK: Oil (Thick, 2003) - The City On Film - "Lost My Lights (acoustic)"
Various - In The Film They Made Us A Little More Articulate (Escape Goat, 2003) - The City On Film - "Bad Liver And A Broken Heart"
Various - My Favorite Songwriters (Five One Inc., 2004) - The City On Film - "I'd Rather Be Wine Drunk (demo)"
Various - Polyvinyl Does Polyvinyl (Polyvinyl, 2016) - Braid- "Next of Kin"
Various - Planet Home Series Vol 2. (Arctic Rodeo, 2017) - Bob Nanna - "Valparaiso / Smallpox Champion"

Miscellaneous
Various - Exquisite Corpse (Polyvinyl) - "So Much To See"
Various - The Actuality Of Thought (Bifocal Media, 2001) -- live footage of Braid's "What A Wonderful Puddle" - VHS
Hubcap - Those Kids Are Weirder LP/CD (Actionboy, 1996 54'40 Or Fight!, reissue 2001)
Bob Nanna - Threadless Songs'' LP (Self-released, 2014)

See also
Braid
Hey Mercedes
The City on Film

References

External links
Official Website
Bob Nanna's Blog
Bob's Twitter

1975 births
Living people
American rock singers
Singers from Chicago
21st-century American singers
21st-century American male singers